Edward Browning "E. B." McClain (April 29, 1940 – November 9, 2020) was an American politician. He served as a Democratic member of both the Alabama Senate (1995 through 2009) and the Alabama House of Representatives (1987 through 1994), before being convicted of felony charges related to his political service.

Background
McClain was born in Bessemer, Alabama. He received his degree in chemistry from Miles College.

Conviction 
McClain vacated his senate seat on January 21, 2009, after being convicted in the U.S. District Court for the Northern District of Alabama on 48 counts of theft, money laundering, mail fraud, bribery, conspiracy, and political corruption. In conspiracy with Pastor Samuel L. Pettagrue, McClain stole over $150,000 of government grant money. He was sentenced to 70 months. While in prison on the federal charges, he was also found guilty on a related state charge, for which he was sentenced to one year to be served concurrently with the federal sentence.

Death 
McClain died on November 9, 2020, at his home in Pleasant Grove, Alabama.

References

External links
Alabama State Legislature - Senator Edward B. "E. B." McClain official government website
Follow the Money - Edward (E B) McClain
2006 2002 1998 campaign contributions

1940 births
2020 deaths
Democratic Party Alabama state senators
African-American state legislators in Alabama
Democratic Party members of the Alabama House of Representatives
Politicians convicted of mail and wire fraud
American money launderers
People from Bessemer, Alabama
People from Pleasant Grove, Alabama
Miles College alumni
African-American chemists
Alabama politicians convicted of crimes
20th-century African-American people
21st-century African-American people